David Nitschmann der Wagner, or David "Father" Nitschmann Sr., (1676, Zauchtenthal/Suchdol nad Odrou - 1758, Pennsylvania) was a Czech-born Moravian missionary and carpenter.

Biography
Born in Zauchtenthal, Moravia, on September 18, 1676, David Nitschmann was a son of Johannes Nitschmann and Catharina (Friedrickin) Nitschmann.

Following the death of his parents in 1692, he continued to reside in Moravia. On November 15, 1700, he wed Anna Schneider, a daughter of Andreas Schneider. The marriage would last thirty-five years.

Sometimes referred to as "Father" David Nitschmann, to distinguish him from other famous David Nitschmanns, he was the father of Anna Nitschmann, second wife of Count Zinzendorf. Tradition has it that Zinzendorf unofficially adopted him as his father.

Nitschmann moved to Herrnhut in 1725. He then traveled to St. Thomas, U.S. Virgin Islands, where he served as a Moravian missionary and where his wife Anna died.  

Finally, he moved to the Province of Pennsylvania in North America. Arriving in Nazareth on December 14, 1740, he helped to expand and strengthen that community until March 1741, when he and his nephew, David Nitschmann, began work on building the new community of Bethlehem, Pennsylvania. Joining them in this endeavor were Johann Bühner, Martin Mack, Matthias Seibold, Anton Seiffert, and David Zeisberger. He remained active with this project until January 1747.

He died in Bethlehem on April 14, 1758, and was buried in "God's Acre" cemetery there.

Legacy
Nitschmann is sometimes considered the founder of Bethlehem, but that is not correct, although he was a leading figure in the early days.

References

External links 
"David Nitschmann, Sr. (1676-1758), Bethlehem Diary, Volume XVIII, 1758, 267-79." Bethlehem Digital History Project, Moravian University, retrieved online December 23, 2022.
"David “Father” Nitschmann (1676-1758), oil on canvas by Johann Valentin Haidt (1700-1780)." Bethlehem, Pennsylvania: Moravian Archives, retrieved from the web archives December 23, 2022.

People from Pennsylvania
1676 births
1758 deaths
Moravian Church missionaries
Czech people of the Moravian Church
Czech Protestant missionaries
Immigrants to the Thirteen Colonies
Protestant missionaries in the United States Virgin Islands